A Sentimental Story is a 1997 Chinese romantic thriller television drama series directed by Zhao Baogang and written by Hai Yan. The story is about a young policewoman falling in love with a gangster she pursues. A smash hit, the series is credited with catapulting lead actress Xu Jinglei, a little-known Beijing Film Academy student, to national fame.

Plot
Some years ago, an Italian violin that Niccolò Paganini had supposedly used was stolen from a Beijing orchestra, smuggled overseas, but miraculously recovered a few years later by the Chinese law enforcement. Strangely, nothing about its recovery was ever printed in the press. Spurned by the police, an intrigued journalist (Pu Cunxin) tracks down Lu Yueyue (Xu Jinglei), a former policewoman who now works as a B-girl in a night club. She also refuses to speak on the case, but he proves more resilient than she expects. Finally she agrees to tell him the whole story, under the condition that he never publishes his story—unless she dies.

After leaving China, the violin first landed in Bangkok before being sold to Poon Dai-wai (Wan Yeung-ming) in Hong Kong, who had just inherited his late father's enterprise. Poon gave the violin to Fung Sai-man (Leung Kai-chi), a senior triad boss, as a present, but when one of Fung's employees secretly brought the violin back to him, Poon hid it and denied knowledge before Fung. That night, the defector was assassinated and several of Poon's employees were shot. Poon Dai-wai decided to send his younger brother Poon Siu-wai (Liu Han-chiang) to mainland China to protect him from Fung's wrath.

Lu Yueyue had just begun working for the Ministry of Public Security when they received intelligence from the Hong Kong Police Force about the possible link between Poon Siu-wai and the stolen violin. To her great excitement, she was assigned to the team working on the case.

Cast and characters
Pu Cunxin as Mr. Hai, the journalist/narrator
Hong Kong
Liu Han-chiang as Poon Siu-wai, a Hong Kong youngster who just graduated from a high school in Taiwan
Wan Yeung-ming as Poon Dai-wai, Siu-wai's brother who owns the successful Poon family enterprise 
Wong Bo-mei as Poon Ching-lam, Siu-wai's sister
Cheung Chan-Sang as Ng Tin-lam, Poon Ching-lam's husband
Pang Mei-seung as Mrs. Poon, Siu-wai's mother
Leung Kai-chi as Fung Sai-man, a real estate tycoon who is also a triad boss
Kou Xiaolie as Baldy Wah, Fung's right-hand man
Zhang Wang as Roy, an assassin who works for Fung
Beijing
Xu Jinglei as Lu Yueyue, a young policewoman who just graduated from National Police University of China majoring in criminal investigation
Du Zhiguo as Wu Lichang, leader of the police squad working on the case
Ding Zhicheng as Li Xianghua, Wu Lichang's deputy
Jiang Wu as Xue Yu, a young policeman who has a crush on Lu Yueyue
Fu Biao as Liu Baohua, a senior policeman
Ji Yuan as Ji Chunlei, a senior policeman
Xu Xiulin as Lu Yueyue's mother

References

Chinese crime television series
Chinese romance television series
Mandarin-language television shows
Cantonese-language television shows
Television shows filmed in Beijing
Television shows based on Chinese novels
1997 Chinese television series debuts